Ashrang is a village development committee in Gorkha District in the Gandaki Zone of central Nepal. At the time of the 1991 Nepal census it had a population of 3241 in 604 individual households.

References

External links
UN map of the municipalities of Gorkha District

Populated places in Gorkha District